Lingvo internacia means international language in Esperanto. It may refer to:

 Esperanto, the original name for the language
 Lingvo Internacia (periodical), the second Esperanto periodical, published monthly from 1895 to 1914
 Unua Libro, the original title of the 1887 book by L. L. Zamenhof

Esperanto